Bakhtiyar Mammadov (born 29 September 1993), known professionally as Jah Khalib is a Kazakh rapper, singer and record producer.

Biography 
Bakhtiyar Mammadov was born on September 29, 1993, in Almaty to an Azerbaijani father and Kazakh mother. He studied musicology and management in the Kazakh National Conservatory.

When starting his solo career, he took on the stage name of Jah Khalib. According to him, Khalib is a fictitious name, while Jah is the name of God in Rastafari. Among his early works, the most popular were "Твои сонные глаза", "SnD", "Сжигая дотла" and "Ты для меня". Soon after, his popularity grew outside Kazakhstan. He released his first solo album in 2016, named "Если че, я Баха".

In 2015 and 2016 he was included in the list of stars of show business and sports of the Forbes Kazakhstan magazine. In June 2017, he won the Muz-TV 2017 Prize for the "Breakthrough of the Year" nomination. In 2018, he received his first Golden Gramophone Award for the song "Медина" in Moscow.

In the summer of 2019, he moved to Kyiv, where he continued to work on his album "Выход в свет". He released the album on 29 October 2019, which contained 14 tracks.

Personal life 
He got married in the summer of 2020.

Discography

Studio albums 
 KHALIBания души - released in 2015
 Джазовый грув - released in 2016
 Всё что мы любим - released in 2016
 Если чё, я Баха - released in 2016
 E.G.O. - released in 2018
 Выход в свет - released in 2019
 911 - released in 2020
 Баха и Дмитрий Карантино - released in 2020
 Мудрец - released in 2021

References 

1993 births
Russian hip hop musicians
Living people
English-language singers from Russia
Azerbaijani musicians
Ethnic Kazakh people
Russian record producers